Military slang is an array of colloquial terminology used commonly by military personnel, including slang which is unique to or originates with the armed forces. In English-speaking countries, it often takes the form of abbreviations/acronyms or derivations of the NATO Phonetic Alphabet, or otherwise incorporates aspects of formal military terms and concepts. Military slang is often used to reinforce or reflect (usually friendly and humorous) interservice rivalries.

Acronym slang in the U.S. Military

A number of military slang terms are acronyms. Rick Atkinson ascribes the origin of SNAFU (Situation Normal, All Fucked Up), FUBAR (Fucked Up Beyond Any Repair or "All Recognition"), and a bevy of other terms to cynical GIs ridiculing the United States Army's penchant for acronyms.

Terms then end up being used in other industries as these GIs complete their services. For example, FUBAR evolved into Foobar as GIs coming home from World War II matriculated into Massachusetts Institute of Technology, with the first written use from a club at MIT called the Tech Model Railroad Club.

See also
 List of government and military acronyms
 List of U.S. government and military acronyms
 List of U.S. Air Force acronyms and expressions
 List of U.S. Marine Corps acronyms and expressions
 List of U.S. Navy acronyms and expressions
 Army creole
 Grande Armée slang (French Army slang during the Napoleonic Wars)
 :Category:Military pidgins
 Vertidue
 Voice procedure
 Junjiahua, also known as "military speech", a collection of scattered modern day Chinese dialects derived from the lingua franca of the Ming dynasty (1368–1644) military

References

Further reading

External links

 Glossary of Military Terms & Slang from the Vietnam War
 Military Terms of the Modern Era
 Military Slang Acronyms and Abbreviations
 
 
 

 
Military humor